Stasera sciopero is a 1951 Italian comedy film directed by Mario Bonnard.

Plot    
Augusto, rich and miserly pizzicagnolo, is attacked on his way home. During the fight the attacker is fatally wounded with his own revolver. He was a poor fool, known for his incurable prodigality.

In the clinic where he is hospitalized, Augusto is subjected to a particular operation: the surgeon, after learning that a prodigal died fighting with a miser, decides to insert the brain of the poor attacker into the skull of Augustus.

The result of the operation transforms the pizzicagnolo: he experiences moments of prodigality alternating with as many relapses into avarice. In a moment of euphoria he agrees to the wedding of his daughter, always opposed for reasons of convenience, and during the wedding banquet he is hit in the head by an iron ball: finally the fusion of the two brains is completed.

Cast
Virgilio Riento as Augusto  
Marisa Merlini as Gemma 
Clelia Matania as Marta 
Carlo Croccolo as Pasquale 
Laura Gore  as Anna 
Lamberto Picasso as The scientist 
Renato Mariani as The Knight 
Paul Muller as The Mad Man 
Leopoldo Valentini as The Shoe Maker'' 
Ciro Berardi    
Nerio Bernardi    
Marcello Martana    
Gisella Monaldi 
Jone Morino
Anna Primula    
Gigi Reder   
Marcella Rovena   
Alberto Sorrentino    
Roberto Spiombi   
Claudio Villa

References

External links

1951 films
1950s Italian-language films
Italian comedy films
1951 comedy films
Italian black-and-white films
1950s Italian films